The Flag of Atacama Region is one of the regional symbols of the Chilean Atacama Region.

This emblem was created in 1859 during the Chilean Revolution of 1859, when liberal rebel forces fought against the national government. After the revolutionaries were defeated, the flag went out of use until recent times.

The design is a blue field with a yellow star in the center. This is not clear who was the creator, but is attributed to Pedro León Gallo Goyenechea, the leader of rebels. The star and colours would represent the secularist-laicist and liberal ideology that was defended in the rebellion.

This flag was adopted officially in 1997 by the Regional Government of Atacama. The regional flag must be hoisted on the building of the Regional Government and any other where he performs his duties, according to the regional rules.

See also
Flag of Valdivia

References

External links
About the Atacama Flag 

Atacama Region
Atacama
Atacama